Borre is a village in the municipality of Horten,  Vestfold county, Norway. The village of Borre had provided the name of the former Borre municipality.

The name
The Old Norse form of the name was Borró. The meaning of the name is unknown.

History
The municipality was created as Borre formannskapsdistrikt in 1837 and bore the municipality number 0717. On 1 January 1858, the city of Horten was separated from Borre to constitute a separate administrative unit, leaving Borre with a population of 2,954. Horten got the municipality number 0703, the third digit of zero indicating its city status.

Starting in 1921, a series of border adjustments which moved territory from Borre to Horten took place. The parts moved to Horten in 1921, 1951 and 1986 had 287, 308 and 22 inhabitants respectively. On 1 January 1965, the urban municipality Åsgårdstrand was incorporated into Borre, losing its city status and number 0704. The enlarged Borre municipality retained the number 0717, and had 6,651 inhabitants as a result of the merger.

On 1 January 1988, Horten and Borre, with 9,098 and 12,994 inhabitants respectively, merged to form a new municipality. The name of the new municipality was Borre, but it was given the number 0701, indicating continued city status. The village of Borre has a population of 681. On 1 June 2002, the name of the municipality was changed to Horten, following a referendum held in conjunction with the 2001 parliamentary election. The referendum was a close call with 6,557 votes for the name Horten and 6,218 votes for Borre. Horten municipality still carries the municipality number 0701.

Borre Church

Borre Church (Borre Kirke) is a medieval era church dating from the first half of the 1100s. Inside the church previously hung a three-meter high wooden cross from the 1300s. The church is built in Romanesque style with a rectangular nave and a narrower chancel. Borre church was built of natural stone, laid in thick walls. The nave and chancel have a gable roof  with a turret.

The pulpit is from about 1600.  The church has a Baroque altarpiece carved of wood by Abel Schrøder in 1665. The side panels show scenes from the life of Jesus, the Annunciation, Nativity, Jesus' baptism and prayer in Gethsemane. The pulpit is Renaissance, with pictorial representations of the virtues. The church has two bells which are both were recast.

Between 1926 and 1928, the church underwent extensive restoration work under the direction of architect Lorentz Harboe Ree. At that time, the entrance was also re-built. The church has seating for approximately 300 people.

Borrevannet
At the south end is a designated bird sanctuary where you can see numerous water birds, waders, and many other bird types. The lake houses many varieties of fish including pike, perch and eel. The association that manages the lake, Borrevannets Grundeierforegning, uses the fishing card sales to promote water quality improvement initiatives and fishing research projects. It is also possible to rent one of the privately owned cabins, for example, Asketun hytte. On the east side of the lake the pumping station can be visited, although this is currently being rebuilt. The new building will house a new activity center, also run by the council who offer a large number of educational programs, primarily but not exclusively designed for schools.

Other Attractions
Borre National Park covers 45 acres (182,000 m2). Its collection of burial mounds include a large  collection of royal tombs.
Borre mound cemetery (Borrehaugene) from the Old Norse words borró and haugr meaning mound.  The Borre style of Norse art is named after a boat grave from Borre.

References

Other sources
Lillevold, Eyvind  Borre bygdebok (Borre, 1954)

Villages in Vestfold og Telemark
Former municipalities of Norway